The Ceratocystidaceae are a family of fungi in the class Sordariomycetes, subclass Hypocreomycetidae.

Genera
As accepted in 2020; (with amount of species)
Ambrosiella  (10)
Berkeleyomyces  (2)
Bretziella  (1)
Ceratocystis  (105)
Chalaropsis  (3)
Davidsoniella  (4)
Endoconidiophora  (9)

Huntiella  (29)
Meredithiella  (3)
Phialophoropsis  (2)

Thielaviopsis  (7)

References

External links

Ascomycota families
Microascales